Sean Snowden is a former professional rugby league footballer who played in the 1980s. He played at club level for Stanley Rangers ARLFC, and Castleford (Heritage No. 639).

References

External links
Stanley Rangers ARLFC - Roll of Honour

Living people
Castleford Tigers players
English rugby league players
Place of birth missing (living people)
Year of birth missing (living people)